Alpha Psi Lambda National, Inc., is a co-educational, Latino-oriented fraternity which began in 1985 at Ohio State University. It is the first co-ed fraternity for Latino college students in the United States. Today the Fraternity has more than 4,000 members, with 41 collegiate chapters and 8 Affiliate chapters; Its National headquarters is in Chicago, Illinois. Alpha Psi Lambda is dedicated to helping develop, share, and celebrate the Latino culture through academics and family.

History
Alpha Psi Lambda was founded in May 1984, when Dr. Josue Cruz, an assistant vice provost for the Office of Minority Affairs at Ohio State University, aided a group of students in researching existing Greek Letter Organizations with the idea of forming a Latino-affinity group. Rather than join an existing group, the students decided to establish a new on-campus organization, co-educational in nature and with a Latino affinity. The thirteen founding members were as follows: 

By 1991, it had emerged out of the Midwest region with the establishment of a chapter at Southern Methodist University in Dallas, Texas. In 1998, the Fraternity became a founding member of NALFO, a trade association of Latino fraternities and sororities, and remains a member today. Growth continued and 49 chapters have been established as of 2022.

Dr. Josue Cruz was recognized in 2020 as an honorary founder of Alpha Psi Lambda National, Inc. for his contributions.

Mission and purpose
At its founding, the Fraternity identified its mission: "To promote continued personal and collective growth of our membership, success and unity through education, leadership, cultural awareness, and community service."

To support this mission, the Fraternity identified an eight-fold statement of purpose as the aim of both chapters and individual members:
Serve the university campus and community.
Bring forth on a scholastic level, Hispanics/Latinos, and others at the university on the basis of friendship.
Provide a supplementary educational, social, and cultural experience for the mutual cultivation of its members.
Advocate for the needs and concerns of Hispanic/Latino students.
Promote a basis for the diversity of the Hispanic/Latino cultures.
Enhance the educational experience through social and cultural activities, and assist in the development of members' leadership abilities.
Promote inter-fraternity relations.
Foster positive relations between the Greek system, University/College Administration, and the outside community."

Chapters
Alpha Psi Lambda chapters note a "Founding Line" to recognize the initial class of chapter founders, which becomes the chapter's nickname. Collegiate chapters have been formed at the following schools. Active chapters are indicated in bold and inactive chapters are indicated in italic.

Notes

Alumni clubs

References

National Association of Latino Fraternal Organizations
Student societies in the United States
Hispanic and Latino American organizations
Fraternal service organizations based in Chicago
Latino fraternities and sororities
Student organizations established in 1985
1985 establishments in Ohio